Eupithecia rusicadaria is a moth in the family Geometridae. It is found in Algeria.

References

Moths described in 1910
rusicadaria
Moths of Africa